Hall High School, also known as Spring Valley Hall, or HHS, is a public four-year high school located at 800 West Erie Street in Spring Valley, Illinois, a small city in Bureau County, Illinois, in the Midwestern United States. HHS serves the communities and surrounding areas of Spring Valley, Bureau, Cherry, Dalzell, Ladd, and Seatonville. The campus is located 20 miles west of Ottawa, Illinois, and serves a mixed small city, village, and rural residential community.

Academics

Potential reference/citation:

Athletics

Hall High School participated in the Three Rivers Conference, North Division, and is a member school in the Illinois High School Association. Their mascot is the Red Devils, with school colors of red and white. The school has 2 state championships on record in team athletics and activities: Boys Football in 1995–1996 (3A) and 2001–2002 (3A).

Formerly apart of the NCIC Conference at the beginning of the 2013–2014 school year, Hall joined the Three Rivers Conference.

History

As of 2015, Hall has been in-session in a newly built, 32 million dollar school.

Hall High School has no known consolidations in the recent past. Surrounding communities may have possessed high schools at some time which were consolidated into the current HHS. Potential reference/citation:

References

External links
 Hall High School District 502

Public high schools in Illinois
Schools in Bureau County, Illinois